Share and Share Alike is a 1925 American silent drama film directed by Whitman Bennett and starring Jane Novak, James Rennie and Henry Sands.

Cast
 Jane Novak as Marcia Maynard 
 James Rennie as Sam Jefford 
 Henry Sands as Titus 
 Cortland Van Deusen as Banjamin Maynard 
 Frank Conlan as Duncan 
 Joseph Burke as Le Blanc 
 Bernard Randall as Alfonse 
 Mario Majeroni as Sick Man 
 Henri Myrial as Mark, Opie

References

Bibliography
 Koszarski, Richard. Hollywood on the Hudson: Film and Television in New York from Griffith to Sarnoff. Rutgers University Press, 2008.

External links

1925 films
1925 drama films
Silent American drama films
Films directed by Whitman Bennett
American silent feature films
1920s English-language films
American black-and-white films
Arrow Film Corporation films
1920s American films